Marianne Thamm is a South African journalist, author and stand-up comedian. She is the assistant editor of the Daily Maverick and has written several books. In 2016 she released the memoir, Hitler, Verwoerd, Mandela and me.

Background
Thamm was born in England where her German father had been a prisoner of war and met Thamm's mother, a Portuguese domestic worker. Thamm describes herself as a “half-Portuguese, half-German, recovering Roman Catholic atheist lesbian immigrant”. She lives in Cape Town with her partner and two daughters.

References

Living people
1961 births
People from Gauteng
People from Pretoria
South African women journalists
South African memoirists
South African autobiographers
South African non-fiction writers
South African people of German descent
South African people of Portuguese descent
White South African people
South African LGBT journalists
South African atheists
South African women comedians
Former Roman Catholics
Women memoirists
South African women columnists